Euphorbia leuconeura is a species of flowering plant in the family Euphorbiaceae. Its common name is Madagascar jewel. It is endemic to Madagascar where its natural habitat is forest undergrowth in rocky areas. It is threatened by habitat loss.

Taxonomy

Cultivation
The Madagascar Jewel is grown as a houseplant for its attractive foliage: dark green leaves, with white veins when young. Unlike many succulents, E. leuconeura is less susceptible to overwatering. It grows best in partial shade but tolerates full shade and is relatively easy to care for providing it is not exposed to cold drafts.

Toxicity
When damaged, the plant secretes a white fluid which is toxic and can cause severe skin irritation. This is typical of most Euphorbia varieties.

References

Endemic flora of Madagascar
leuconeura
Vulnerable plants
Taxonomy articles created by Polbot
Taxa named by Pierre Edmond Boissier